Samuel Roper (died 1658) was an English antiquary.

Samuel or Sam Roper may also refer to:

Samuel Roper (Ku Klux Klan) (1895–1986), American leader of the Ku Klux Klan after 1946
Sam Roper, a circus owner whose sideshow included "Elephant Man", Joseph Merrick
Samuel Phelps-Roper, oldest son of Shirley Phelps-Roper, member of the Westboro Baptist Church